Lac-Bouchette station is a Via Rail station in Lac-Bouchette, Quebec, Canada. It is an optional stop indicated only by a signpost.

External links

Via Rail stations in Quebec
Railway stations in Saguenay–Lac-Saint-Jean